The New Zealand Men's National League is a men's football league at the top of the New Zealand football league system. Founded in 2021, the New Zealand National League is the successor to the New Zealand Football Championship. The league will be contested by ten teams, with teams qualifying from their regional leagues. Four teams qualify from the Northern League, three qualify from the Central League, two qualify from the newly formed Southern League and the Wellington Phoenix Reserves are automatically given a spot each year.

The regional leagues runs from March through to September, with each league having a varying number of games. The Championship phase runs after the completion of the regional phase with each team playing each other once, followed by a grand final. Each season, two clubs gain qualification to the OFC Champions League, the continental competition for the Oceania region.

Competition format 

There are two stages to the competition: the regional phase, in which each team plays each other twice in their respective regions; and the championship phase, in which the top teams in each region play a single round-robin competition, followed by a grand final in order to determine the champion. Each team can field a maximum of four foreign players as well as one additional foreign player who has Oceania Football Confederation nationality. Originally each team had to also start at least two players aged 20 or under in every game. Before the 2023 season this was changed so that players aged 20 or under must account for 10% of available playing minutes throughout the season.

Qualification to OFC Champions League 
Two teams from the National League qualify for the OFC Champions League each season: those two teams being the two finalists of the championship phase.

History
In March 2021, New Zealand Football announced a change to the structure of both the premiership and the top regional leagues around the country. The four top regional leagues (NRFL Premier, Central Premier League, Mainland Premier League and the FootballSouth Premier League) would be formed into the Northern League, Central League, and the Southern League. These leagues would allow local clubs to qualify for the premiership season (now known as the National League Championship), with the top 4 teams from the Northern League, the top 3 teams from the Central League, and the top 2 teams from the Southern League making up the competition, alongside the Wellington Phoenix Reserve side. All teams that qualify plus the Phoenix Reserves, would then play a single round-robin competition between October and December. The top two placed teams will then progress to the Grand Final.

In November 2021, during the first edition of the National League, New Zealand Football announced the National League had been cancelled for that season due to COVID-19. Qualified teams from Auckland and Waikato were unable to participate due to their alert levels. New Zealand Football replaced this with a one-off competition, the South Central Series, for teams qualifying from the Central League and Southern League. Miramar Rangers were both the premiers and champions for this stand alone competition.

The 2022 New Zealand National League Championship phase will kick off on 1 October 2022.

Current clubs

These are the current clubs for the 2022 season:

Past winners

Qualifying leagues

Championship
{| class="wikitable" style="text-align: center;"
|-
!rowspan=2 |Season
!colspan=3|Grand Final
|-
!Champions
!Score
!Runners-up
|-
| 2021{{efn|2021 National League season cancelled due to COVID-19 pandemic in Northern regions;. Championship played as South Central Series, with the northern clubs missing in the first edition.}}
| Miramar Rangers
| 7–2
| Wellington Olympic
|-
| 2022
| Auckland City 
| 3–2
| Wellington Olympic
|}

By region

By city/town

Top scorers

RecordsThe records are up to date as of the end of the 2022 season. As the 2021 season was cancelled, the 2021 South Central Series was not officially part of the National League.''
 Biggest home win: – Wellington Olympic 7–1 Christchurch United (19 November 2022)
 Biggest away win: – Melville United 0–4 Wellington Olympic (9 October 2022)
 Highest scoring match:
 Birkenhead United 5–3 Cashmere Technical (30 October 2022)
 Wellington Olympic 7–1 Christchurch United (19 November 2022)
 Most goals scored in a season: 30 – Wellington Olympic (2022)
 Most goals scored in a season (including final): 32 – Wellington Olympic (2022)
 Fewest goals conceded in a season: 8 – Wellington Olympic (2022)
 Highest points in a season: 22 – Auckland City, Wellington Olympic (both 2022)

Related competitions

OFC Champions League

The OFC Champions League, also known as the O-League, is the premier football competition in Oceania. It is organised by the OFC, Oceania's football governing body. It has been organised since 2007 under the current format, following its successor, the Oceania Club Championship. Two teams from the New Zealand National League participate annually. Four O-League titles have been won by teams from New Zealand.

Charity Cup

The Charity Cup was introduced in 2011 and is contested between the winner of the National League Grand Final and the winner of the Chatham Cup.

See also
 Football in New Zealand
 New Zealand National Soccer League
 National Women's League

References

External links
 National League official website
 Northern Region official website
 Capital/Central Region official website
 RSSSF.com – New Zealand – List of Champions

New Zealand National League
New Zealand
1
Summer association football leagues
National championships in New Zealand
Sports leagues established in 2021
2021 establishments in New Zealand
Professional sports leagues in New Zealand